Ipurupalem is an out growth of Chirala, located in Bapatla district of the Indian state of Andhra Pradesh. It is administered under Chirala mandal of Chirala revenue division. It was earlier a part of Chirala mandal of Prakasam district.

Government and politics
Ipurupalem gram panchayat is the local self-government of the village. The elected members of the gram panchayat is headed by a sarpanch.

References

Chirala